Charlotte Salt (born 12 August 1985) is an English actress best known for her many characters in British and US television series such as Casualty, Bedlam and The Musketeers, also in many films, including Beneath Still Waters in 2005, Beowulf in 2007, and Blood and Glory in 2016.

Early life and acting career
Salt studied at Newcastle-under-Lyme College in Staffordshire, England. At 16 years, Salt had already appeared in several television projects, the series In a Land of Plenty, television film The Whistle-Blower, series The Inspector Lynley Mysteries, the BBC family drama series Born and Bred.  
Salt was a regular in the US TV series Wildfire as Gillian Parsons for 13 episodes from 2006–07. In 2009, she guest starred as Lady Ursula Misseldon on The Tudors, and as Lady Arabella Marchand du Belmont in the TV movie A Princess for Christmas.

From 2011–2018, Salt played Sam Nicholls on Casualty, including a four-year hiatus, before her character's death in the opening episode of the thirty-third series. She has also been a regular in Bedlam (2012) and The Musketeers (2015).

Salt has a minor role in the Amazon Studios film Everybody's Talking About Jamie, released in September 2021. 
Salt is a close friend of Irish actress and A Princess for Christmas co-star Katie McGrath.

Other work
In 2013, Salt co-created, with chef Raymond Blanc, an animated children's cooking app, called Henri Le Worm, about a cast of insects, voiced by actor Simon Pegg. The app is designed to inspire children to discover nature in Henri’s magical “Forest of Plenty”.

Filmography

Television

References

External links

Charlotte Salt on Vimeo
Charlotte Salt Voice-over agent- SM Voices
Charlotte Salt as Sam Nichols

1985 births
21st-century English actresses
English film actresses
English television actresses
Living people
People from Newcastle-under-Lyme
Actors from Staffordshire